The following is a list of squads for each national team competing at the 2018 UEFA European Under-17 Championship in England. Each national team had to submit a squad of 20 players born on or after 1 January 2001.

Group A

England
England named their squad on 3 May 2018.

Head coach: Steve Cooper

Switzerland
Switzerland named their squad on 26 April 2018.

Head coach: Stefan Marini

Italy
Italy named their squad on 1 May 2018.

Head coach: Carmine Nunziata

Israel
Israel named their squad on 26 April 2018.

Head coach: Gadi Brumer

Group B

Slovenia
Slovenia named their squad on 23 April 2018.

Head coach: Agron Šalja

Norway
Norway named their squad on 18 April 2018.

Head coach: Gunnar Halle

Portugal
Portugal named their squad on 1 May 2018.

Head coach: Rui Bento

Sweden
Sweden named their squad on 17 April 2018.

Head coach: Roger Franzén

Group C

Republic of Ireland
Republic of Ireland named their squad on 4 May 2018.

Head coach: Colin O'Brien

Bosnia and Herzegovina
Bosnia and Herzegovina named their squad on 24 April 2018.

Head coach: Sakib Malkočević

Denmark
Denmark named their squad on 16 April 2018.

Head coach: Michael Pedersen

Belgium
Belgium named their squad on 23 April 2018.

Head coach: Thierry Siquet

Group D

Serbia
Serbia named their squad on 24 April 2018.

Head coach: Ivan Jević

Netherlands
Netherlands named their squad on 23 April 2018.

Head coach: Kees van Wonderen

Germany
Germany named their squad on 25 April 2018.

Head coach: Michael Prus

Spain
Spain named their squad on 23 April 2018.

Head coach: Santi Denia

References

External links
Squads on UEFA.com

UEFA European Under-17 Championship squads
2018 UEFA European Under-17 Championship